Aleksandr Alekseyevich Motuzenko (born July 11, 1967), also known as Oleksandr Oleksiyovych Motuzenko, is a Soviet-born Ukrainian sprint canoer who competed in the late 1980s and early 1990s. At the 1988 Summer Olympics in Seoul, he won a silver medal in the K-4 1000 m event.

Motuzenko also won six medals at the ICF Canoe Sprint World Championships with three golds (K-4 500 m: 1987, 1989, 1990), two silver (K-4 500 m: 1986, K-4 1000 m: 1990), and a bronze (K-4 1000 m: 1987).

References

External links
 
 
 

1967 births
Canoeists at the 1988 Summer Olympics
Living people
Olympic canoeists of the Soviet Union
Olympic silver medalists for the Soviet Union
Soviet male canoeists
Ukrainian male canoeists
Olympic medalists in canoeing
ICF Canoe Sprint World Championships medalists in kayak
Medalists at the 1988 Summer Olympics